Tambo River may refer to:
Tambo River (Peru)
Tambo River (Victoria), Australia